Lacanobia atlantica, the Atlantic arches moth, is a species of cutworm or dart moth in the family Noctuidae. It is found in North America.

The MONA or Hodges number for Lacanobia atlantica is 10297.

References

Further reading

 
 
 

Lacanobia
Articles created by Qbugbot
Moths described in 1874